The Trade Space Visualizer is a data visualization tool developed at the Applied Research Laboratory (ARL) at The Pennsylvania State University. Initial development started in 2002, and it is currently supported by a team at ARL/Penn State.

Overview 

The Trade Space Visualizer is a Java-based tool that includes multidimensional visualization techniques to display data files. The interface can load data in tabular format (.txt or .csv format). Recent work has focused on using the interface to drive underlying simulation models, by allowing users to place visual steering commands within data visualization plots.

Visualization Capabilities

 3D Glyph Plots
 2D Scatter Plot
 Scatter Matricies
 Parallel Coordinates
 Histogram plots
 Binned Plots

Additional Features
 Visual Steering
 Brushing/Linked Views
 Preference Shading	
 Pareto Frontiers
 Supports continuous, discrete, categorical, and datetime variables
 K-Means Clustering
 Principal Component Analysis
 Add Calculated Columns

Further reading 
 Stump, G.M., Lego, S., Yukish, M., Simpson, T. W., Donndelinger, J. A., Visual Steering Commands for Trade Space Exploration : User-Guided Sampling With Example. Journal of Computing and Information Science in Engineering, 2009. 9(4): p. 044501:1-10.
 Stump, G.M., Yukish, M., Simpson, T. W., and O'Hara, J. J. Trade Space Exploration of Satellite Datasets Using a Design By Shopping Paradigm. in IEEE Aerospace Conference. 2004. Big Sky, MT.

External links
 ARL/Penn State Trade Space Visualizer

Data visualization software